KF1 is the top level of karting. It is open to drivers aged 15 and up.

This class used to be called Formula A and has changed since January 2007 when CIK-FIA decided to replace the 100 cc water-cooled two-stroke engines with 125 cc Touch-and-Go (TaG) water-cooled two-stroke engines (KF type). The engines produce .
KF1 class karts use  hand-operated front brakes. The front brakes are activated by a Lever. Chassis and engines must be approved by the CIK-FIA.

Karts are equipped with an electric starter and clutch. The engine rpm is limited at 16,000 rpm.

As the Formula One of karting, KF1 has high costs and drivers typically spend $100,000 per year to compete. It is needed to finance much practice, training and testing, team costs, chassis and engines, tires and parts, and traveling. Most teams in this category are factory teams or financed by chassis or engine manufacturers.

Drivers typically compete in national competitions, then move into international racing in the KF3 or KF2 classes where they must finish in the top 34 to qualify to compete in KF1. Once in KF1, drivers either stay for a few years to improve their skills before moving on to car racing, or they become professional kart racers and race in KF1 until they retire. Many successful racing drivers and all current F1 drivers started their careers in karts.

There is a European KF1 Championship, a World Cup, and a World Championship, the sport's main event. Since 2016 the new generation of Original Karts (OK) machines have taken over from the old KF engines.

Champions

See also
 KF2, a KF1 feeder series
 KF3, a KF1 and KF2 feeder series
 KZ1, the fastest KZ karting racing category
 KZ2, the second fastest KZ karting racing category
 Superkart, road racing with kart sized open-wheel cars

References

External links
 CIK-FIA website
 Karting 1 – Karting Information. Tips, Guides, Interviews, and Karting Features

Kart racing series
KF1